Laughter and Tears can refer to:

 Laughter and Tears (1913 film), a 1913 Swedish film directed by Victor Sjöström
 Laughter and Tears (1921 film), a 1921 Dutch film